The Rietvlei dam is an earth-fill type dam and  is one of a number of dams supplying water to the Pretoria region of South Africa. It supplies around 41 million liters of drinking water daily, about 5.9% of the water requirement of Pretoria. The dam mainly serves for municipal and industrial use. Its hazard potential has been ranked high (3).

Constructed as an earth-fill dam wall with a brick core in 1932/4, it was extended between 1988 and 1990 by raising the dam wall with the addition of a concrete wave wall and a reinforced earth barrier wall, as well as a surfaced roadway, on top of the original wall.

The dam is fed by the Rietvlei, a river of the Crocodile River (Limpopo) basin, as well as by five fountains and five boreholes.

The Rietvlei Nature Reserve occupies the area immediately surrounding the dam.

See also 
 Rietvlei Nature Reserve

References

External links 
Ecological State of the Major Rivers and Streams within the Northern Service Delivery Region of the Ekurhuleni Metropolitan Municipality
Rietvlei Dam - A fishing guide

Dams completed in 1934
Dams in South Africa
Crocodile River (Limpopo)
1934 establishments in South Africa